This is a list of rural localities in Kabardino-Balkaria. The Kabardino-Balkarian Republic (Kabardino-Balkarskaya Respublika; Kabardian: Къэбэрдей-Балъкъэр Республикэ, Ķêbêrdej-Baĺķêr Respublikê; Karachay-Balkar: Къабарты-Малкъар Республика, Qabartı-Malqar Respublika) or Kabardino-Balkaria (Kabardino-Balkariya), is a federal subject of Russia (a republic) located in the North Caucasus. As of the 2010 Census, its population was 859,939 on 12,500 square km. Its capital is Nalchik.

Baksan 
Rural localities in Baksan urban okrug:

 Dygulybgey

Baksansky District 
Rural localities in Baksansky District:

 Kremenchug-Konstantinovskoye

Chegemsky District 
Rural localities in Chegemsky District:

 Nartan

Chereksky District 
Rural localities in Chereksky District:

 Kashkhatau

Leskensky District 
Rural localities in Leskensky District:

 Anzorey

Prokhladnensky District 
Rural localities in Prokhladnensky District:

 Yekaterinogradskaya

Zolsky District 
Rural localities in Zolsky District:

 Etoko
 Zalukokoazhe

See also
 
 Lists of rural localities in Russia

References

Kabardino-Balkaria